Daniel Sharp (born 10 December 1987 in Auckland) is a former swimmer on New Zealand's paralympic team. He competed at the 2004 Summer Paralympics in Athens, the 2008 Summer Paralympics in Beijing, and the 2012 Summer Paralympics in London.

Winning a bronze medal in 2004 for the 100 m breaststroke, he competed again in 2008 and won a silver medal. He won silver again for the same event in 2012.

Sharp currently holds the world record in the SB13 category over 50 m breaststroke.

References

External links 
 
 

1987 births
Living people
New Zealand male breaststroke swimmers
Paralympic swimmers of New Zealand
Paralympic silver medalists for New Zealand
Paralympic bronze medalists for New Zealand
Paralympic medalists in swimming
Swimmers at the 2004 Summer Paralympics
Swimmers at the 2008 Summer Paralympics
Swimmers at the 2012 Summer Paralympics
Medalists at the 2004 Summer Paralympics
Medalists at the 2008 Summer Paralympics
Medalists at the 2012 Summer Paralympics
World record holders in paralympic swimming
S13-classified Paralympic swimmers
20th-century New Zealand people
21st-century New Zealand people